Naumati Baja (literally – Nine musical instruments) is a group of nine traditional musical instruments played in Nepal and Himalayan region of Sikkim, Darjeeling and Assam during certain auspicious occasions like weddings. 

Naumati is more comprehensive form of the Panchai Baaja. Panchai Baaja (or a band of five instruments) has been played since olden times as a good luck to any auspicious performances. There is a reference in the scriptures that Panchai Baaja was played in the Dvapara Yuga on the auspicious occasion of the Christening Ceremony of the Lord Krishna. The Panchai Baaja represents the five metals and while designing these instruments, the images of five deities viz; Ganesh, Vishnu, Shiva, Goddess and the Sun were kept as the background. Later, four more instruments were added to this set of five instruments and called Naumati Baaja (nine musical instruments).

Nepalese musical instruments
Indian musical instruments
Nepalese music

References